Douglas Alfred Cashion  (23 January 1907 – 27 September 2004) was an Australian politician.

He was born in Bothwell. In 1949 he was elected to the Tasmanian House of Assembly as a Labor member for Wilmot in a recount following Peter Pike's resignation. He held his seat until 1972, when he was defeated. He was awarded an AO in 1978.

References

1907 births
2004 deaths
Members of the Tasmanian House of Assembly
Australian Labor Party members of the Parliament of Tasmania
20th-century Australian politicians
Officers of the Order of Australia